Marko Radonjić (born 6 February 1993) is a Serbian professional basketball player for Borac Čačak of the Basketball League of Serbia and the ABA League.

Professional career
On 18 April 2018, Radonjić signed for Dynamic. In August 2018, he signed for OKK Novi Pazar.

On 21 July 2020, Radonjić signed a two-year contract with FMP. 

In July 2022, Radonjić signed with Borac Čačak for the 2022–23 season.

National team career
Radonjić was a member of the Serbia national under-17 team that placed 5th at the 2010 FIBA Under-17 World Championship. Over eight tournament games, he averaged 5.8 points, 2.5 rebounds and 1.4 assists per game.

References

External links
 Marko Radonjić at realgm.com
 Marko Radonjić at eurobasket.com

1993 births
Living people
ABA League players
Basketball League of Serbia players
BK Iskra Svit players
BC Balkan Botevgrad players
KK Borac Čačak players
KK Crvena zvezda youth players
KK Dynamic players
KK FMP players
KK Napredak Kruševac players
KK Sloga players
KK Vojvodina Srbijagas players
OKK Novi Pazar players
Point guards
Serbian expatriate basketball people in Bulgaria
Serbian expatriate basketball people in Slovakia
Serbian men's basketball players
Sportspeople from Kruševac
Youth Olympic gold medalists for Serbia
Basketball players at the 2010 Summer Youth Olympics